The following lists events that happened during 2012 in Cape Verde.

Incumbents
President: Jorge Carlos Fonseca
Prime Minister: José Maria Neves

Events
A campus of the Universidade de Santiago opened in the São José Seminary in Praia
March 8: São Vicente's airport name became Cesária Évora Airport
July 1: 2012 local elections took place

Sports

Sporting Clube da Praia won the Cape Verdean Football Championship

References

 
Years of the 21st century in Cape Verde
2010s in Cape Verde
Cape Verde
Cape Verde